Gilbert Tosetti (1 August 1879 – 16 April 1923) was an English cricketer.  Tosetti was a right-handed batsman who bowled right-arm medium pace.  He was born at Bromley, Kent.

Tosetti made his first-class debut for Essex against Oxford University in 1898.  He played first-class cricket for Essex from 1898 to 1905, making 41 appearances, the last of which came against Nottinghamshire in the 1905 County Championship.  In his 41 first-class appearances, Tosetti scored 1,054 runs at an average of 18.49, with a high score of 132 not out.  This score, which was his only first-class century, came against Lancashire in 1902.  With the ball, he took 16 wickets at a bowling average of 55.68, with best figures of 3/67.

His brother, the Military Cross recipient Major Douglas Tosetti, was killed in action in 1918 during World War I.  Tosetti died at Eldoret in Kenya on 16 April 1923.

References

External links
Gilbert Tosetti at ESPNcricinfo
Gilbert Tosetti at CricketArchive

1879 births
1923 deaths
People from Bromley
English cricketers
Essex cricketers
British people in British Kenya